Eutychia, phonetically transliterated as Eftychia is a Greek female given name, meaning "happiness". It is derived from the Greek words εὖ (good) and τύχη (luck). The diminutive Effie is a pet form of Eftychia.

Eftychia may also refer to:
 Eftychia Karagianni - Greek water polo player and Olympic medalist.

Greek feminine given names